Corynitis is a monotypic moth genus of the family Erebidae. Its only species, Corynitis penicillalis, is found in Rio de Janeiro, Brazil. Both the genus and the species were first described by Carl Geyer in 1832.

References

Herminiinae
Monotypic moth genera